The Cherasco Synagogue is the old synagogue of the Jewish community of Cherasco, Italy.

History

A Jewish community, engaged in silk production and banking, is recorded in Cherasco from the 16th century onward. A ghetto was defined in 1723, but Jews continued to live outside the ghetto. In 1813, Abramo (Abraham) Debenedetti served on the town council. Emilio Debenedetti, an engineer, designed and constructed the town electrical system.

The Cherasco synagogue is of uncertain date. A date of 5557 (1797) on a stone plaque above a stone basin for ritual washing on a staircase may refer to the date of the synagogue's construction, or of a renovation.

The Cherasco Synagogue is one of about sixteen that survive in Piedmont, including the Synagogue of Casale Monferrato, the Biella Synagogue and the Vercelli Synagogue.

The synagogue has been preserved, but is no longer in use. It is sometimes open to visitors.

Architecture

The small synagogue is lit by windows overlooking the courtyard. The courtyard location concealed within a residential building is typical of synagogues built in pre-modern Italy. It was a precautionary measure taken so that none of the sounds of Jewish worship should reach Christian ears and possibly provoke a pogrom or repressive anti-Jewish measures. This location also permitted Jews to enter the synagogue without going outside the ghetto.

The 18th-century late-Baroque Torah ark and bimah feature the twisted Solomonic columns long popular in Italian synagogues. The doors of the ark feature the Ten Commandments in gilded lettering. The "elegant" free-standing octagonal bimah is of carved wood with two sides open to allow access, and an elaborately painted and gilded baldachin. Benches for seating are arranged along the walls of the small synagogue. Decorative wall inscriptions include the names of families who once lived in Cherasco.

There is a women's gallery, and a room that once was the school of the small Jewish community. As of 2003, the schoolroom contained an exhibition on "Jewish Life and Culture - Photographic Documentation of the Jewish Presence in the 18th and 19th Centuries," curated by Giorgio Avigdor in 1984.

References

Sources

External links
  - De Benedetti - Cherasco 1547 Foundation]
 Gallery of pictures of the synagogue after restoration, De Benedetti - Cherasco 1547 Foundation
 Image of the Cherasco Synagogue bimah

Synagogues completed in the 1790s
Baroque synagogues in Italy
Buildings and structures in the Province of Cuneo
Synagogues in Piedmont
Tourist attractions in Piedmont
Cherasco